Huete is a municipality in Cuenca, Castile-La Mancha, Spain. It has a population of 2,097.

During the Spanish Civil War, the municipality was the location of a small hospital where Annie Murray served as one of the nurses.

References

Municipalities in the Province of Cuenca